Trbojević is a Serbian name, which may refer to:

Ben Trbojevic (born 2001), Australian rugby league player
Dušan Trbojević (1925–2011), Serbian pianist, composer, musical writer and university professor
Jake Trbojevic (born 1994), Australian rugby league player
Jovanka Trbojević (1963–2017), Finnish composer
Petar Trbojević (born 1973), Serbian water polo player
Tom Trbojevic (born 1996), Australian rugby league player

Serbian surnames
Croatian surnames